Mid Sussex is a constituency represented in the House of Commons of the UK Parliament from 2019 by Mims Davies, a Conservative. She is currently a minister in the Department for Work and Pensions.

Constituency profile
The constituency is in the north east of West Sussex bordering East Sussex, containing relatively small villages and the towns of East Grinstead, Haywards Heath and Burgess Hill, all of which have green buffers preventing them from being contiguous and rail connections to Brighton, London Gatwick Airport and the City of London.  The motorway network is also close by, the M23 providing access to this, west of the main towns.

Income levels are on average considerably higher than the national average and levels of rented and social housing are below the national average, particularly levels seen in cities.

Boundaries

1974–1983: The Urban Districts of Burgess Hill and Cuckfield, and the Rural District of Cuckfield.

1983–1997: The District of Mid Sussex wards of Ardingly, Bolney, Burgess Hill Chanctonbury, Burgess Hill Franklands, Burgess Hill North, Burgess Hill St Andrews, Burgess Hill Town, Burgess Hill West, Clayton, Cuckfield, East Grinstead East, East Grinstead North, East Grinstead South, East Grinstead West, Haywards Heath Ashenground, Haywards Heath Bentswood, Haywards Heath Franklands, Haywards Heath Harlands, Haywards Heath Heath, Horsted Keynes, Hurstpierpoint, Keymer, Lindfield Rural, Lindfield Urban, and West Hoathly.

1997–2010: The District of Mid Sussex wards of Ardingly, Burgess Hill Chanctonbury, Burgess Hill Franklands, Burgess Hill North, Burgess Hill St Andrews, Burgess Hill Town, Burgess Hill West, Cuckfield, East Grinstead East, East Grinstead North, East Grinstead South, East Grinstead West, Haywards Heath Ashenground, Haywards Heath Bentswood, Haywards Heath Franklands, Haywards Heath Harlands, Haywards Heath Heath, Horsted Keynes, Lindfield Rural, Lindfield Urban, and West Hoathly.

2010–present: The District of Mid Sussex wards of Ashurst Wood, Bolney, Burgess Hill Dunstall, Burgess Hill Franklands, Burgess Hill Leylands, Burgess Hill Meeds, Burgess Hill St Andrews, Burgess Hill Victoria, Cuckfield, East Grinstead Ashplats, East Grinstead Baldwins, East Grinstead Herontye, East Grinstead Imberhorne, East Grinstead Town, Haywards Heath Ashenground, Haywards Heath Bentswood, Haywards Heath Franklands, Haywards Heath Heath, Haywards Heath Lucastes, High Weald, and Lindfield.

History
The constituency was created in 1974 from parts of the seats of Lewes and East Grinstead, and has undergone significant boundary changes at every periodical review that it has been around for. Prior to 1973, the local government district had actually been a part of East Sussex, but as a result of delayed implementation of the Local Government Act 1972, it was almost wholly moved into West Sussex.

At the 1983 general election, it gained some of the wards (including East Grinstead itself) previously contained in the East Grinstead constituency (which disappeared at that election, its last MP Geoffrey Johnson Smith contested and won the new seat of Wealden in East Sussex), and at the 1997 election, it gained many of the semi-rural wards with smaller communities between East Grinstead and Crawley.

From its creation in 1983 to the present, it has been a Conservative seat, with the primary opposition until the 2015 election being the Liberal Democrats and their predecessors the Liberal Party. In 2015, there was a severe fall in Liberal Democrats support. Labour's candidate come second in the seat for the first time in its history. In 2017, Labour consolidated this lead at the 2017 General Election by gaining almost double the votes of the Liberal Democrats.

In the 2016 European Union referendum, Mid Sussex voted for the United Kingdom to remain a member of the European Union. Despite this, Soames called for MPs to back Theresa May's withdrawal agreement. However, he was one of the 21 Conservative rebels who voted to allow Parliament to vote to legislate to prevent a no deal Brexit on 3 September 2019, and subsequently became an independent, after the rebels had the Conservative whip removed. He then decided not to stand for re-election although he had the whip restored before dissolution.

Members of Parliament

Elections

Elections in the 2010s

Davies had served as Member of Parliament for Eastleigh from 2015 until the 2019 election was called.

Elections in the 2000s

Elections in the 1990s

This constituency underwent boundary changes between the 1992 and 1997 general elections and thus change in share of vote is based on a notional calculation.

Elections in the 1980s

This constituency underwent boundary changes between the 1979 and 1983 general elections and thus calculation of the change in share of vote is not possible.

Elections in the 1970s

See also
List of parliamentary constituencies in West Sussex

Notes

References

Sources
Election result, 2015 (BBC)
Election result, 2010 (BBC)
Election result, 2005 (BBC)
Election results, 1997–2001 (BBC)
Election results, 1997–2001 (Election Demon)
Election results, 1983–1997 (Election Demon)
Election results, 1974–2001 (Political Science Resources)

Parliamentary constituencies in South East England
Constituencies of the Parliament of the United Kingdom established in 1974
Politics of West Sussex
Politics of East Sussex
Mid Sussex District